Bonane Heritage Park is an private archaeological preserve and tourist attraction between Bonane and Kenmare in County Kerry, Ireland.

The area is surrounded by the Sheehy and Caha Mountains. It is home to a number of archaeological remains, including ring fort and stone circle sites. Some studies have indicated that some of these  archaeological remains "may well have had an astronomical significance".

References

External links
http://www.bonaneheritagepark.com/

Archaeological sites in County Kerry